Marshall Street Historic District may refer to:

Marshall Street Historic District (Allegan, Michigan), listed on the National Register of Historic Places in Allegan County, Michigan
Marshall Street Historic District (Coldwater, Michigan), listed on the National Register of Historic Places in Branch County, Michigan